The Drents-Friese Wold National Park is a national park in the Dutch provinces of Friesland and Drenthe, covering more than , founded in 2000. It consists of forests, heath lands and drift-sands.

Landscape and history
It is sure that people lived in this area already in the Stone Age. In the landscape several graves from that time are visible. The present characteristics of the area are strongly influenced by the 'esdorp culture'. Farmers used the lands for grazing by their sheep. The continuous removal of minerals resulted in heathlands and sand-drifts. In the 19th century, the state started forestry programmes and species such as oak, pine, Douglas fir and Japanese larch were planted. These trees still cover a large part of the area.
The brook Vledder Aa is one of the very few remaining natural brooks in the Netherlands.

Vegetation and wildlife
In the national park we find among others the European pine marten (Martes martes), the Smooth snake (Coronella austriaca), the Great Crested Newt (Triturus cristatus), the 
Viviparous lizard (Zootoca vivipara), the Common Raven (Corvus corax), Stiff clubmoss
(Lycopodium annotinum) and Bog-rosemary (Andromeda polifolia).

Management
The most important management organisations for the park are:
 Staatsbosbeheer (State Forest Service), owns .
 Natuurmonumenten (main Dutch private nature management organisation, owns .
  (private provincial nature management organisation, owns .
 Maatschappij van Weldadigheid (a 'society of beneficence'), owns .
The rest of the park is managed by 80 private owners.

Recreation
The park contains many bike trails. In Appelscha, Hoogersmilde, and Diever are visitor and information centres.

References

External links

 

Protected areas established in 2000
2000 establishments in the Netherlands
Forests of the Netherlands
National parks of the Netherlands
Geography of Drenthe
Geography of Friesland
Tourist attractions in Drenthe
Tourist attractions in Friesland
Ooststellingwerf
Westerveld